KMXA-FM (99.9 FM, "Mix 99.9") is an adult contemporary radio station in Minot, North Dakota owned by iHeartMedia, Inc. During the Christmas season "Mix 99.9" plays continuous Christmas music. The station begins playing the Christmas music the day after Thanksgiving and runs until Christmas Day.

iHeartMedia also owns and operates KCJB 910 (Country/Talk), KRRZ 1390 (Classic Hits/Talk), KIZZ 93.7 (Top 40), KYYX 97.1 (Country), and KZPR 105.3 (Mainstream Rock) in Minot.

External links
Mix 99.9 website

MXA-FM
Mainstream adult contemporary radio stations in the United States
Radio stations established in 1983
IHeartMedia radio stations